Institución Atlética Sud América, usually known as Sud América or just IASA, is a football club from Montevideo. They currently play in the Uruguayan Segunda Division.

History
Sud América has won the Uruguayan 2nd Division on 7 occasions, this is a national record they share with Fénix. It was a hard-to-beat team back in the days and it was very economically stable.

After the relegation to 2nd Division in 1996, Sud América competed consecutively without success for 16 seasons, becoming the most popular team of the division. In the 2013 season (17th consecutive season in second) the club achieved the promotion to the Elite Division complying with its objectives wanting to return to it as a celebration of its centenary.

Sud América usually play their home games at Estadio Carlos Angel Fossa which is located in Montevideo and has a capacity of 6,000 spectators.

Kit evolution

Performance in CONMEBOL competitions
Copa CONMEBOL: 1 appearances
1995: Second Round

1995 Copa CONMEBOL

Sud América eliminated via penalties (4–3) due to draw on points 3–3.

Current squad

Managers
  Julio César Ribas (Jan 1, 1994 – Dec 31, 1995)
  Julio Acuña (Jan 1, 2003 – July 1, 2003)
  Luis López (2004)
  Tabaré Silva (Aug 1, 2009 – May 21, 2010)
  Alejandro Apud (Aug 1, 2011 – June 30, 2014)
  Jorge Vivaldo (July 15, 2014 – Oct 5, 2015)
  Julio Comesaña (2015 – 2016)
  Maxi Viera (Oct 8, 2020 – Feb 10, 2021)
  Claudio Biaggio (Mar 6, 2021 – Oct 4, 2021)
  Luis López (Oct 5, 2021 – )

Titles
Segunda División: 7
1951, 1954, 1957, 1963, 1975, 1994, 2013

 Divisional Intermedia: 1
1926

External links
  

 
Football clubs in Uruguay
Association football clubs established in 1914
Football clubs in Montevideo
1914 establishments in Uruguay